The voiceless glottal affricate is a type of consonantal sound, used in some spoken languages. The tie bar may be omitted, yielding  in the IPA and ?h in X-SAMPA.

Features
Features of the voiceless glottal affricate:

Occurrence

Notes

References

 
 
 

Affricates
Glottal consonants
Pulmonic consonants
Voiceless oral consonants
Central consonants